Serruria stellata, the star spiderhead, is a flower-bearing shrub that belongs to the genus Serruria and forms part of the fynbos. The plant is native to the Western Cape, South Africa.

Description
Fire destroys the plant but the seeds survive. Two months after flowering, the fruit falls off and ants disperse the seeds. They store the seeds in their nests. The plant is unisexual and pollinated by insects.

Distribution and habitat
The plant occurs from the Stettyns Mountains to the western Riviersonderend Mountains.

References

Vulnerable plants
stellata
Shrubs
Vulnerable species